Kathgodam is a suburb of Haldwani city in the Nainital district of Uttarakhand state of India. It used to be a part of the twin township of Haldwani-Kathgodam, and is immediately north of Haldwani. It is one of the important collection centres for forest products obtained from Kumaon Himalayas.

History
Literally meaning timber depot, Kathgodam was a small village in 1901 with a population of 375, though its importance grew rapidly after the railway line was extended here in late 19th century, after it reached Haldwani in 1884. It was previously called 'Chauhan Patta' as it is still recorded in the land records. The advent of the residence of Dan Singh Bist nearby in Beer Bhatti, Jeolikote, and his setting up his major timber depot as the 'Timber King of India' as Chauhan Patta, led to it being called 'Kathgodam'. Similarly, Beer Bhatti is called thus as it was previously an area where the British India Corporation Limited pursued a Beer Brewery until 1924 when Dan Singh Bist purchased it from them via deed registered at Nainital.

Today, the town contains a terminus station on its Indian Railways line. From this point, one must travel by automobile to the Kumaon region of the Himalayan Mountains.  From Kathgodam, mountain roads lead to tourist destinations like Nainital, Bhimtal, Sattal, Mukteshwar, Ranikhet, Binsar, Kausani, Naukuchiyatal and Almora.

Geography

It has an average elevation of 554 metres (1,483 feet). It is situated on the banks of the Gaula river.

Kathgodam is one of the most picturesque locations situated in the Bhabar region, the foothills of Kumaon Himalayas.

Local attractions

Close to Kathgodam are beautiful temples called 'Sheetla devi' and  'Kalichaud' which attract large numbers of devotees from the surrounding region during festivals.
Kathgodam also leads a way to one of the beautiful ashram called as Hairakhan.

There is a beautiful dam which is built on the Gola River.

Schools include the Maharishi school, Nirmala Convent Sr. Sec. School, St. Theresa School, St. Paul's Senior Secondary School, Naini Valley School, Inspiration School and Beersheba School.(these arranged from katghodam to haldwani).

College include Kumaun Institute of Information Technology (KIIT) on Nainital road and Pahal Institution for capacity building close to the railway station.

Kathgodam Railway Station has been awarded the cleanest railway station three times.

Demographics
As per provisional data of 2011 census Haldwani-cum-Kathgodam urban agglomeration had a population of 252,060, out of which males were 121,363 and females were 110,697. The literacy rate was 85.17 per cent.

References

Haldwani-Kathgodam
Cities and towns in Nainital district